Brother Firetribe is a Finnish hard rock band. They take their name from a direct English translation of the name of the former professional tennis player Veli Paloheimo. The name is a reference to an in-joke, where the perfect description for their music is ‘tennis heavy metal’.

History 
The band was formed in 2002 at Kerava as vocalist Pekka Heino, keyboardist Tomi Nikulainen and bassist Jason Flinck met with guitarist Emppu Vuorinen.

Their first album False Metal was released by Spinefarm in 2006. The first album was later re-issued as Break Out.

In 2009 Brother Firetribe joined Pain on the "European Cynic Campaign 2009" tour. Pain also toured with Nightwish, and Emppu Vuorinen, one of Nightwish's founding members, was the guitarist for Brother Firetribe. The band appeared at Nottingham Trent University's Rockingham Festival 2017.

Founding guitarist Emppu Vuorinen stepped down from the band in February 2020, citing lack of time due to his commitments with Nightwish. 
Latest album, Feel the Burn, was released in 2020, the first to feature new guitarist Roope Riihijärvi. Two tracks feature Vuorinen, who was still in the band when work on the album began.

Brother Firetribe has released five studio albums and one live DVD.

Members
Pekka Ansio Heino – vocals (2002–present)
Jason Flinck – Bass guitar, backing vocals (2002–present)
Tomppa Nikulainen – keyboards (2002–present)
Hannes Pirilä – drums, percussion (2014–present)
Roope Riihijärvi – guitars (2020–present)

Former Members:
Kalle Torniainen – drums, percussion (2002–2014)
Emppu Vuorinen – guitars (2002–2020)

Discography

Albums

Singles and EPs

DVDs

Notes
Track Listing, Single And Release Date For "Heart Full Of Fire" Revealed 9 February 2008

External links
Official Homepage
Band profile on Spinefarm

References

Finnish hard rock musical groups
Finnish glam metal musical groups